This is a list of Sites of Community Importance in Castile and León.

See also 
 List of Sites of Community Importance in Spain

References 
 Lisf of sites of community importance in Castile and León

Castile and León